Jeffery is a given name or a surname. As a surname, it is a Cornish variant of the more commonly spelled given name Jeffrey.

It may refer to:

Surname
 Aaron Jeffery (born 1970), New Zealand-born actor
 Alshon Jeffery (born 1990), American football player
 Arthur Jeffery (1892–1959), Australian-born professor of Semitic languages
 Clara Jeffery (born 1967), American journalist
 Darren Jeffery (born 1976), English opera singer
 George Barker Jeffery (1891–1957), English mathematical physicist
 Keith Jeffery (1952–2016), Northern Irish historian
 Margaret Jeffery (1920–2004), British swimmer and Olympian
 Michael Jeffery (1937–2020), Australian soldier and Governor-General
 Michael Jeffery (manager) (1933–1973), English manager of musicians including Jimi Hendrix
 Paul Jeffery, alias of author F. Gwynplaine MacIntyre (1948–2010)
 Ralph Lent Jeffery, Canadian mathematician
 Simon Jeffery (fl. 2000s), business manager in the video games industry
 Thomas B. Jeffery (1845–1910), British-born entrepreneur and inventor in the United States
 Tony Jeffery (born 1964), American football player

Given name
 Jeffery Amherst, 1st Baron Amherst, officer in the British Army
 Jeffery Deaver, American mystery/crime novelist
 Jeffery Demps, Florida football player and sprinter
 Jeffery Lamar Williams, better known under his stage name Young Thug (born 1991), American rapper
 Jeffery Simmons (born 1997), American football player
 Jeffery Taylor (born 1989), Swedish basketball player
 Jeffery Xiong, American chess grandmaster

See also
 Jeff, a given name (and list of people with the name)
 Jeffrey (name), a more commonly spelled variant of the name
 Jeffry, a given name

English masculine given names
English-language surnames